Ling Yun was a Chinese politician who served as the inaugural Minister of State Security.

Ling Yun may also refer to:

 Ling Yun (actor) (born 1941), Taiwanese actor (Hong Kong Nocturne)
 Ling Yun (born 1925), Chinese actor, writer, and director from Hong Kong.
 Ling Yun (singer) (凌雲, also known as Rita Chao), Singaporean-Chinese singer

See also
 Lingyun County, Guangxi, China